AT&T Digital Life, headquartered in Dallas, Texas, was a maker of wireless home security systems with burglary and fire monitoring for homes and apartments in the United States. Digital Life services are no longer supported starting September 1, 2022.

Since 2022
AT&T Digital Life was discontinued in 2022. Users were given the option to switch to Brinks Home security with upgraded cameras and a touchpad. Users were also allowed to keep their current equipment and use it until the final day of service.

Residential Security 
AT&T Digital Life's home security systems consisted of security and automation equipment and 24/7 monitoring.

Products
Each user was able to customize the AT&T Digital Life wireless system to fit their home. AT&T Digital Life offered packages, and with a basic system, users could add extra sensors, video cameras, motion sensors, or other devices.  AT&T Digital Life users were able to add additional AT&T Digital Life devices to the system at any time. AT&T Digital Life wireless home security systems were also available to renters and homeowners.

Services
24/7 Professional Monitoring, Video Monitoring, Remote Door Locks, Lighting and Thermostat Control, Water Detection and Fire and  Carbon Monoxide Monitoring.

Mobile Access
Users were able to get use of mobile access to arm, disarm and control the AT&T Digital Life security system. Mobile access was able to be used to arm and disarm the system, view video from security cameras, monitor sensors lock and unlock doors, and turn off devices utilizing smart plugs.

References

AT&T subsidiaries
Technology companies established in 2012
Security companies of the United States